Gheorghe Alexandrescu (1912–2005) was a Romanian anticommunist.
He graduated his Ph.D. in law Magna cum laude in 1939 from Rome, Italy. He was member of the Romanian National Liberal Party (PNL) from 1934 to 1947. 

In 1987 he published a clandestine newspaper which demanded: restitution of capital expropriated by the social government and Down with communism!.  He was arrested by the police (Securitate).
 
In 1989, after the restoration of capitalism, Gheorghe Alexandrescu was among the founders of the reborn National Liberal Party (PNL).

Publications  
 The Two Cancers of Mankind and Dacia Felix – published in Bucharest 1997    

1912 births
2005 deaths
Romanian expatriates in Italy